Evan Thomas (birth unknown – death unknown) was a Welsh professional rugby league footballer who played in the 1910s. He played at representative level for Wales, and at club level for Salford, as a forward (prior to the specialist positions of), during the era of contested scrums.

Playing career

International honours
Evan Thomas won 2 caps for Wales in 1911–1914 while at Salford.

Championship final appearances
During Evan Thomas' time there was Salford's 5-3 victory over Huddersfield in the Championship Final during the 1913–14 season.

Challenge Cup Final appearances
Evan Thomas played as a forward, i.e. number 9, in Salford's 0-5 defeat by Bradford F.C. in the 1906 Challenge Cup Final during the 1905–06 season at Headingley Rugby Stadium, Leeds on Saturday 28 April 1906.

References

Place of birth missing
Place of death missing
Rugby league forwards
Salford Red Devils players
Wales national rugby league team players
Welsh rugby league players
Year of birth missing
Year of death missing